Erich Swoboda (30 August 1896, in Vienna – 22 November 1964, in Graz) was an Austrian historian and ancient Roman archaeologist. In 1946, he became an associate professor at the University of Graz and became the director of the Institute for the History of Antiquity and Antiquity in Vienna. From 1951 to 1953, he served as a dean, and from 1960 to 1961 was the rector of the university. He received the Austrian Decoration for Science and Art.

Selected publications

References 

1896 births
1964 deaths
Austrian archaeologists
20th-century Austrian historians
Members of the German Academy of Sciences at Berlin
20th-century archaeologists